Anta may refer to:

Biology
 Fava d'anta, a tree found in Brazil
 South American tapir, known in Portuguese as ''
 Phytelephas seemannii, known in Quechua and Choco as ''

Places

Peru
 Anta, Ancash, a village in Carhuaz Province, Ancash Region
 Anta, Cusco Region, a town in southern Peru
 Anta District (disambiguation), several districts
 Anta Province, in the Cusco Region
 Anta (Canchis), a mountain in the Canchis Province, Cusco Region
 Anta Mantay, a mountain in Lima Region
 Anta Maqana, a mountain in Huancavelica Region
 Anta P'unqu, a mountain in Quispicanchi Province, Cusco Region
 Anta Q'asa, a mountain spanning the Junín and Lima Regions
 Anta Ranra, a mountain in Lima Region

Other places
 Anta Department, in Salta Province, Argentina
 Anta, a civil parish of the municipality of Espinho, Portugal

Other uses
 Anta (architecture), posts or pillars on either side of a doorway or entrance of a Greek temple
 American National Theater and Academy (ANTA)
 Anta Sports, Chinese sportswear manufacturer
 Anta Livitsanou, Greek actress
 Australian National Travel Association (ANTA or A.N.T.A)
 Anta, a variety of the Upper Morehead language of Papua New-Guinea

See also

 Ananta (disambiguation)
 Antah, a city and a municipality in Baran district in the state of Rajasthan, India
Antal (given name)
Antal (surname)
Antão, name
Anth (disambiguation)